The Battle of Surfaces was a men's tennis exhibition match that was held on May 2, 2007, between Roger Federer, the then top-ranked men's singles player, and Rafael Nadal, the then world No. 2 in men's singles. The match was played in the capital city of Nadal's home island, Palma de Mallorca, in front of a home crowd at Palma Arena. Nadal won a competitive match 7–5, 4–6, 7–6(12–10).

The match
The match was played on a unique court with a clay surface on one side of the net and grass on the other. The court cost $1.63 million to create and took 19 days to prepare. At the time, Federer had won 48 straight matches on grass courts, going five straight years undefeated on grass, while Nadal had 72 straight wins on clay, going three straight years undefeated on clay.

Before the match, Federer said, We are both looking forward to this absolutely new event. The idea really appeals to me as we both dominate one of the surfaces. Rafa holds the record of 72 victories in series on clay and I have not been defeated on grass since 48 matches. It'll be fun to find out what it's like to play on a court with mixed surfaces! And it ought to be interesting to see who chooses the better tactic. People have been talking about this event for quite a while. Now it's coming up pretty soon already and I like the fact that the stadium - which is very nice, by the way - is located on Majorca, Rafa's home. He has been to Basel, after all, and now I've got the opportunity to play at his place for once.After the match, Nadal said,

It has been a nice experience, although before the match I thought it would be a disaster because I felt it would be very difficult for me to adapt to the court.

See also
Bailey–Johnson 150-metre race
Battle of the Sexes (tennis)

References

External links
Roger Federer, Official Website
Rafael Nadal, Official Website

Tennis tournaments in Spain
Exhibition tennis tournaments
2007 in tennis
Sport in Mallorca
Tennis matches
2007 in Spanish tennis
Rafael Nadal tennis matches
Roger Federer